Kevin J. Kennedy (born 1955) is an American business executive. He is currently the CEO of Quanergy Systems (NYSE: QNGY and QNGY.WS), a growth company that develops software and sensor technology enabling 3D perception and autonomy, after joining the Board in 2019. Before Quanergy, Mr. Kennedy was the president and CEO of Avaya Inc. from January 2009 to October 2017

Kennedy holds a B.S. in mechanical engineering from Lehigh University and an MS and a PhD in engineering from Rutgers University and an EMBA from the University of  Michigan. Before joining Avaya, he was CEO of JDS Uniphase Corporation, and prior to that he had worked at AT&T Bell Laboratories, Cisco Systems where he became a Senior Vice President, and then as Chief Operating Officer of Openwave Systems. During his career he has been elected to the board of directors of the following companies/organizations - UL Inc.,Kla, Digital Realty, Solar Technologies and less recently Agility Communications, Canary Foundation, Freescale Semiconductor,  JDS Uniphase, Openwave, Polycom, Quantum Corporation, Rambus

In 1987, he was a congressional fellow at United States House Committee on Science, Space and Technology, and in 2010 President Barack Obama appointed him to the President's National Security Telecommunications Advisory Committee, completing this service in 2019.

From 1982 to 1984, Kennedy was an adjunct professor at Rutgers where he published papers on computational methods, data networking, and issues of technology management.

References

External links

Avaya employees
American technology chief executives
Living people
1956 births
Lehigh University alumni
Rutgers University alumni
Rutgers University faculty
AT&T people
Cisco people
American telecommunications industry businesspeople
Chief operating officers